Site 32 at the Plesetsk Cosmodrome is a launch complex formerly used by Tsyklon-3 carrier rockets. It consists of a two launch pads, Site 32/1 and Site 32/2, which were used between 1977 and 2009. It has the GRAU index 11P868. Site 32 is, along with Site 35 and Site 41 one of three sites under consideration for the Angara programme.

History
In 1970, the building of a highly-automated launch complex for Tsyklon-3 booster began at Site 32, which was designed by Omsk Transmash Design Bureau led by Chief Designer Vladimir Nikolayevich Chelomey. The first launch from Site 32 was conducted from pad 2 on 24 June 1977, with the first from Site 32/1 following on 23 January 1980. The last launch from Site 32/1 occurred on 28 December 2001. Site 32/2 was retired on 30 January 2009, along with the Tsyklon-3. All 122 Tsyklon-3 launches were conducted from the site. 57 launches were recorded as having been from pad 1 and 65 were recorded from pad 2.

References

Plesetsk Cosmodrome